Rebecca Shearing is a Scottish pop singer. She received popular attention in 2007 when she started uploading videos of herself covering hit songs. She was offered her first record deal in November 2007. She decided to finish school before signing a contract. Interest from labels and record industry professionals continued. Shearing has since decided to pursue her career solo.

Rebecca Shearing's debut EP, Paper Lung, was released on 8 October 2012. She has also supported the likes of Daniel Powter, Orla Gartland and played in a boxing ring in front of Mike Tyson.

Education
Shearing attended Alloway Primary School and Belmont Academy before studying music at Napier University and graduating in 2013 with First Class Honours.

Discography

EPs
Paper Lung (2012) is Shearing's debut EP, released on 8 October 2012.

Track list

References

Living people
1992 births
21st-century Scottish women singers
Scottish pop singers
People from South Ayrshire
People educated at Belmont Academy
Alumni of Edinburgh Napier University